Eunidia lateralis is a species of beetle in the family Cerambycidae. It was described by Charles Joseph Gahan in 1893.

References

Eunidiini
Beetles described in 1893
Taxa named by Charles Joseph Gahan